Jerzy "Jurek" Gębczyński (born 1 December 1962) is a Polish former footballer who played in the III liga, Ekstraklasa, Canadian National Soccer League, and the Canadian Professional Soccer League.

Playing career  
Gębczyński began his career in 1979 with Lechia Dzierżoniów in the III liga. In 1986, he played in the Polish top tier league the Ekstraklasa with Gornik Wałbrzych. The following season, he returned to Lechia Dzierżoniów for a season. In 1992, he played abroad with London City in the National Soccer League. In 1999, he was selected for the CPSL All-Star roster against a Canada Development Team. In 2000, he was elevated as the head coach to London. Gębczyński was appointed the head coach for the CPSL All-Star team in 2002 against TSV Munich 1860.

References 

1962 births
Living people
People from Duszniki-Zdrój
Sportspeople from Lower Silesian Voivodeship
Polish footballers
Polish football managers
Górnik Wałbrzych players
London City players
Ekstraklasa players
Canadian National Soccer League players
Canadian Soccer League (1998–present) players
Canadian Soccer League (1998–present) managers
Association football midfielders
Polish expatriate footballers
Expatriate soccer players in Canada
Polish expatriate sportspeople in Canada